Montgomery High School is a public high school located in Santa Rosa, California. It is part of the Santa Rosa High School District, which is itself part of Santa Rosa City Schools.

Montgomery High School was named after Bill Montgomery. Montgomery is considered the first person from the city of Santa Rosa to have died in World War II. William "Billy" Montgomery was killed at Pearl Harbor on December 7, 1941, while serving aboard the battleship .

Montgomery participates in the International Baccalaureate Organization as an IB World School, providing the IB Diploma Programme as well as the full complement of classes available to juniors and seniors. Montgomery High School has been an IB World School since July 1995.

On March 1st 2023, a 16 year-old student was stabbed to death by another student on the school’s campus.

Awards and recognition
During the 1990–1991 school year, Montgomery High School was recognized with the Blue Ribbon School Award of Excellence by the United States Department of Education, the highest award an American school can receive.

Montgomery was recognized as a California Distinguished School by the California Department of Education in 1990.

Demographics

2011–2012
 1,742 students:

Notable alumni
 Melba Pattillo Beals (born 1941), member of the Little Rock Nine, a group of African-American students who were the first to integrate Little Rock Central High School; attended Montgomery for her senior year.
 Nancy Ling Perry (1947–1974), member of the Symbionese Liberation Army.
 Mel Gray (born 1948), wide receiver for the St. Louis Cardinals from 1971 to 1982.
 Mark Illsley (born 1958), writer & director of Happy, Texas
 Scott Ware (born 1983), former safety on the football team of the University of Southern California and the practice squad of the Indianapolis Colts
 Koa Misi (born 1987), outside linebacker for the Miami Dolphins.
 Dan Hicks (1941–2016) singer in Dan Hicks & His Hot Licks and The Charlatans
 Sulo Williams (1973–2016) actor, writer, and producer of the movie, Convincing Clooney
 Brandon Hyde (born 1973) Manager of the Baltimore Orioles 2019-
 Sara Hall (née Bei) (born 1983) professional American middle-distance runner.
 Kim Conley (born 1986) Olympic middle and long-distance runner.

See also
 List of school districts in Sonoma County, California
 List of Sonoma County high schools
 Vikings

References

External links 
 

International Baccalaureate schools in California
High schools in Santa Rosa, California
Educational institutions established in 1958
Public high schools in California
1958 establishments in California